Jessica Moskaluke (born June 4, 1990) is a Canadian country singer and songwriter. She released her debut studio album, Light Up the Night in April 2014, which includes the platinum-certified single "Cheap Wine and Cigarettes". She has one #1 hit on the Billboard Canada Country chart with "Country Girls".

Career
In June 2011, Moskaluke won the Next Big Thing contest, sponsored by Big Dog 92.7 and SaskMusic. In September 2011, she won the New Artist Showcase Award at the Canadian Country Music Association Awards. She was chosen to represent Canada at the Global Artist Party at the 2012 CMA Music Festival.

Moskaluke's debut single, "Catch Me If You Can", was released on June 4th, 2012. The song's music video received regular airplay on CMT. It was followed by an EP, also titled Catch Me If You Can, which was released on September 4, 2012 by MDM Recordings and distributed by EMI Music Canada. Jeff DeDekker of the Leader-Post gave the EP four stars out of five, writing that "by using the full extent of her voice and also incorporating tenderness and fragility, Moskaluke is able to cover the complete spectrum of material." Casadie Pederson of Top Country also gave the EP four stars out of five, calling Moskaluke "one of the best young talents we've seen in a long time." The EP's second single, "Hit N Run", reached the top 40 on the Billboard Canada Country chart in 2013. Moskaluke was named Female Vocalist of the Year at the 2013 Saskatchewan Country Music Association Awards.

Moskaluke released the first single from her debut studio album, "Good Lovin'", in October 2013. It became her first single to reach the top 20 on the Billboard Canada Country chart. The album, Light Up the Night, was released on April 15, 2014. "Cheap Wine and Cigarettes" and "Used" were both released as singles from the album in 2014.

In February 2021, she released her second studio album The Demos, which included her first #1 hit "Country Girls", as well as the singles "Halfway Home", "Mapdot", "Leave Each Other Alone", and "Nothin' I Don't Love About You".

Tours
Mapdot (2022)

Discography

Studio albums

Compilation albums

Extended plays

Singles

As lead artist

2010s

2020s

As featured artist

Music videos

Awards and nominations

Notes

References

External links

1990 births
Living people
Canadian women country singers
Musicians from Saskatchewan
Juno Award for Country Album of the Year winners
Canadian Country Music Association Female Artist of the Year winners
Canadian country singer-songwriters
21st-century Canadian women singers
Canadian Country Music Association Album of the Year winners